Sherm Chavoor (1919 – September 3, 1992) was a swimming coach from the United States. He notably coached Olympic swimmers Mark Spitz, Debbie Meyer and Mike Burton, among others at Arden Hills Swimming and Tennis Club, in Carmichael, California, which he founded in 1954. Chavoor coached at the Sacramento YMCA prior to starting Arden Hills.

He was named Coach of the Year by the American Swimming Coaches Association in 1968. He was inducted into the International Swimming Hall of Fame in 1977. He was a coach for the USA's Olympic Swimming teams in 1968 and 1972.

References

American swimming coaches
1992 deaths
1919 births